Paul Barringer (1778–1844) was a North Carolina politician, businessman and military veteran of the War of 1812. General Barringer served in the North Carolina House of Commons (1793, 1794, 1806–1815) and in the North Carolina Senate (1822, 1824), representing Cabarrus County. He was at first a Federalist and later a Whig.

Biography
Paul Barringer was born on September 26, 1778 at Poplar Grove, Mecklenburg County, North Carolina, the son of John Paul Barringer and his wife, Ann Eliza Eisman. He was the brother of Daniel Laurens Barringer, the father of Daniel M. Barringer and Rufus Barringer, and the grandfather of Paul Brandon Barringer and Daniel Barringer. He was married on February 21, 1805 to Elizabeth Brandon, the daughter of Captain Matthew Brandon.

Paul Barringer was commissioned December 23, 1812 by Gov. William Hawkins, and served as Brigadier General of a company of volunteers in the War of 1812. He was a member of the North Carolina House of Commons in the years 1806–1815, and of the Senate in 1822. He died at Burton's Hotel in Lincolnton, North Carolina on June 20, 1844, and was buried in Concord, North Carolina.

References

NCpedia (State Library of North Carolina)
Reminiscences and Memoirs of North Carolina and Eminent North Carolinians by John Hill Wheeler
Barringer Genealogy
The Blackwelder and Allied Families of North Carolina and Illinois by Deward C. Williams

1778 births
1844 deaths
Paul
Members of the North Carolina House of Representatives
North Carolina Federalists
North Carolina state senators
North Carolina Whigs
People from Mecklenburg County, North Carolina
People from Cabarrus County, North Carolina